Joseph Wickham Roe (1871 - 1960) was an American engineer and Professor of Industrial Engineering at the New York University, known for his seminal work on machine tools and machine tool builders history.

Biography 
Roe was born in 1871 as youngest child of Alfred Cox, pastor of a Presbyterian church and educator, and Emma Wickham Roe. After attending the Burr and Burton Academy, he graduated in 1895 at the Yale's Sheffield Scientific School, and after years of practice received his Master of Engineering in 1907.

Roe started his career in industry, working for different manufacturing companies from 1895 to 1907. From 1907 to 1917 he was faculty member at the Sheffield Scientific School, where he taught mechanical engineering and machine design. The last year of the War he was major in the Aviation Section, Signal Reserve Corps of the Army, and afterwards worked for two more years in industry. In 1912 he was appointed Professor of Industrial Engineering at New York University, and chaired of the Department of Industrial Engineering, until his retirement in 1937. In World War II he was consultant for the US Navy and after the War retired and spend his last years in Southport, Connecticut.

Selected publications 
 Joseph Wickham Roe. Steam turbines. 1911.
 Joseph Wickham Roe. English and American tool builders. 1916
 Joseph Wickham Roe. The Mechanical Equipment. 1918.  Vol 3.
 Wallace Clark, Joseph W. Roe, Walter N. Polakov, Harry Tripper. (1921). Foremanship. Young Men's Christian Associations. United Y.M.C.A. schools.
 Joseph Wickham Roe. Connecticut inventors. p. 1934.
 Joseph Wickham Roe. Interchangeable manufacture in American industry.  Newcomen regional meeting address, 1939.
 Joseph Wickham Roe. Ralph Edward Flanders. 1944.

References

External links 

 
 Roe family papers at Yale University.

1871 births
1960 deaths
American industrial engineers
Yale School of Engineering & Applied Science alumni
Yale University faculty
New York University faculty